Montesquieu Airfield was a World War II military airfield in Algeria, located in the mountains near M'Daourouch, about 112 km southeast of Constantine. Its precise location is undetermined. It was built by the US Army Corps of Engineers and was used by the United States Army Air Force Twelfth Air Force during the North African Campaign against the German Afrika Korps.

 320th Bombardment Group, April-29 June 1943, B-26 Marauder
 325th Fighter Group, 5 April-3 June 1943, P-40 Warhawk

When the Americans moved east to Tunisia in June 1943, the airfield was dismantled and abandoned. There are several possible locations of the field visible in aerial photography in the mountains just north of M'Daourouch, but its precise location can not be determined.

References

 Maurer, Maurer. Air Force Combat Units of World War II. Maxwell AFB, Alabama: Office of Air Force History, 1983. .

External links

Airfields of the United States Army Air Forces in Algeria
Airports established in 1942
1942 establishments in Algeria